Aaron Teys (born 7 December 1993) is an international Australian lawn and indoor bowler.

Bowls career

World Championships
In 2020 he was selected for the 2020 World Outdoor Bowls Championship in Australia.

World Singles Champion of Champions
Teys won the 2017 World Singles Champion of Champions defeating Dean Elgar in the final.

Asia Pacific
Teys won double gold in the triples and fours at the 2019 Asia Pacific Bowls Championships in the Gold Coast, Queensland.

National
In 2021, he won the fours title with Corey Wedlock, Brendan Aquilina and Jamie Turner at the delayed 2020 Australian National Bowls Championships.

References

Australian male bowls players
1993 births
Living people